The Hamma Hamma River is a river on the Olympic Peninsula in the U.S. state of Washington. It rises near Mount Washington in the Olympic Mountains within the Olympic National Park and drains to Hood Canal and thence to the Pacific Ocean.

The name Hamma Hamma comes from a Twana village once located at the river's mouth and called Hab'hab, referring to a reed that grows along the river's banks.

See also
List of Washington rivers

References

External links
National Park Service - Olympic National Park

Rivers of Washington (state)
Rivers of Mason County, Washington